YYA may refer to:

 Yueyang Sanhe Airport, IATA code YYA
 Finno-Soviet Treaty of 1948 or YYA treaty